Wangaratta  is a city in the northeast of Victoria, Australia

It can also mean:

 Wangaratta, a Swedish board-game published by Alga, later BRIO, named after the Victoria city
 Wangaratta, Queensland, a locality in Australia